is a private junior women's college in Sapporo, Hokkaido, Japan, established in 1967.

External links
 Official website 

Educational institutions established in 1967
Private universities and colleges in Japan
Universities and colleges in Hokkaido
Minami-ku, Sapporo
Japanese junior colleges